The 2012–13 Cleveland State Vikings men's basketball team represented Cleveland State University in the 2012–13 NCAA Division I men's basketball season. Their head coach was Gary Waters. The Vikings played their home games at the Wolstein Center and were members of the Horizon League. It was the 82nd season of Cleveland State basketball. They finished the season 14–18, 5–11 in Horizon League play to finish in eighth place. They lost in the first round of the Horizon League tournament to UIC.

Roster

Schedule

|-
!colspan=9| Exhibition

|-
!colspan=9| Regular season

|-
!colspan=12|Horizon League tournament

References

Cleveland State Vikings Men's
Cleveland State Vikings men's basketball seasons
Viking
Viking